Barrier-to-autointegration factor is a protein that in humans is encoded by the BANF1 gene. It is a member of the barrier-to-autointegration factor family of proteins.

Function 

The protein encoded by this gene was identified by its ability to protect retroviruses from intramolecular integration and therefore promote intermolecular integration into the host cell genome. The endogenous function of the protein is unknown. The protein forms a homodimer which localizes to the nucleus and is specifically associated with chromosomes during mitosis. This protein binds to DNA in a non-specific manner and studies in rodents suggest that it also binds to lamina-associated polypeptide 2, a component of the nuclear lamina. It also associates with the LEM Domain containing proteins LAP2, Emerin, and MAN1. The protein's DNA binding ability is modulated by ATP concentration.

Interactions 

Barrier to autointegration factor 1 has been shown to interact with Thymopoietin.

Clinical relevance 

Mutations in this gene have been shown to cause hereditary progeroid syndrome.

See also
Retroviral integration

References

Further reading

External links